Jean Louis Tocqué (19 November 1696 – 10 February 1772) was a French painter. He specialized in portrait painting.

Biography 
Jean Louis Tocqué was born on 19 November 1696 in Paris. His father, who was also a painter, died in April 1710, before Louis was even fourteen. He was eventually brought into the care of another artist, Jean-Marc Nattier. Tocqué studied under Nattier, Nicolas Bertin and Hyacinthe Rigaud in the 1720s. He married Jean-Marc Nattier's daughter Marie Nattier in 1747. He died on 10 February 1772 in Paris.

Career 
The first works of Tocqué were painted when he was an apprentice of Jean-Marc Nattier. Louis Tocqué was influenced by Hyacinthe Rigaud, who was also one of his tutors and Nicolas de Largillierre, another French painter. His first major work was the painting of the portrait of Louis XV of France ordered by his great-grandfather Louis XIV, King of France. In 1740 he painted the portrait of Marie Leszczyńska, Queen of France. From 1737 to 1759 more than fifty of the portraits he painted, were regularly part of the exhibitions of the Salon, the official art exhibition of the Académie des Beaux-Arts in Paris . In 1745 he painted the portrait of Infanta Maria Teresa Rafaela of Spain, one year before her death. In 1757 he went to the Russian Empire, where he stayed for two years after being invited by Elizaveta Petrovna, Empress of Russia in order to create a ceremonial portrait of her. This portrait is today part of the permanent collection of the Hermitage Museum of Saint Petersburg in Russia. In the 1760s he traveled to Denmark and created the portraits of the Danish royal family and taught at the Royal Danish Academy of Fine Arts in Copenhagen.

Gallery

Paintings 

 Portrait of Louis, Dauphin of France, 1739
 Portrait of Arnoldus van Rijneveld, 1739
 Portrait of Isaac van Rijneveld, 1739
 Portrait of Marie Leczinska, 1740
 Portrait of Carl Gustaf Tessin, 1741
 Portrait of Jean Michel de Grilleau
 Portrait of Infanta Maria Teresa Rafaela of Spain, 1745
 Madame Dangé faisant des noeuds, 1753
 Portrait of Mademoiselle de Coislin
 Portrait of Ivan Shuvalov
 Portrait of Ekaterina Golovkina, 1757
 Portrait of Empress Elizabeth Petrovna, 1758

References

External links
 Louis Tocqué, Musée du Louvre
 Agence photographique de la réunion des Musées nationaux

1696 births
1772 deaths
18th-century French painters
French male painters
Academic staff of the Royal Danish Academy of Fine Arts
18th-century French male artists